Eois brunnea is a moth in the family Geometridae. It is found in south-eastern Peru.

References

Moths described in 1904
Eois
Moths of South America